Robert Louis Boozer (April 26, 1937 – May 19, 2012) was an American professional basketball player in the National Basketball Association (NBA). Boozer won a gold medal in the 1960 Summer Olympics and won an NBA Championship as a member of the Milwaukee Bucks in 1971. Boozer was a member of the 1960 U.S. Olympic team, which was inducted into the Naismith Basketball Hall of Fame as a unit in 2010.

Early years

Boozer was born and raised in North Omaha, Nebraska, and graduated from Tech High in Omaha. One of his teammates was future Baseball Hall-of-Famer Bob Gibson.  He attended Kansas State University, where he helped lead the Wildcats to the 1958 Final Four and where he received All-America honors in 1958 and 1959.  A versatile 6’ 8" forward, he was selected by the Cincinnati Royals with the first non-territorial pick of the 1959 NBA Draft, but he postponed his NBA career for one year so that he could remain eligible to play in the 1960 Summer Olympics.  During that year he played with the Peoria Caterpillars, where he won the National AAU Tournament title and earned MVP honors for the tournament.

He won a gold medal with the Olympic team after they won eight games by an average of 42.4 points. The team was inducted into the Basketball Hall of Fame in 2010.

NBA career

Cincinnati Royals 

In the fall of 1960, Boozer joined the Royals with Olympic teammate Oscar Robertson.  As a rookie, Boozer contributed 6.4 points and 6.2 rebounds in a reserve role.  The following season, he earned a spot in the Royals’ starting lineup and averaged 13.7 points and 10.2 rebounds.  Boozer continued to improve, averaging 14.3 points and 11.1 rebounds during the 1962–1963 season, but the emergence of forward Jerry Lucas, a future Hall-of-Famer, soon pushed Boozer out of the Royals' long-term plans.

Time with the Knicks and Lakers 

Boozer's contract was sold to the New York Knicks in the middle of the 1963–64 season, and he spent the next 1½ seasons in New York.  Though Boozer was a productive player with the Knicks, he was traded to the Los Angeles Lakers in 1965. After one season in Los Angeles, where he played a supporting role amid players like Jerry West and Elgin Baylor, Boozer was selected by the Chicago Bulls in the 1966 NBA Expansion draft.

Chicago Bulls 

Boozer was selected by the Chicago Bulls in the 1966 NBA Expansion draft. Boozer flourished in his first year with Chicago, averaging 18.0 points and 8.5 rebounds and leading the young franchise into the playoffs.  The following year, he averaged 21.5 points and 9.8 rebounds and became the third Bull to appear in the NBA All-Star Game (after Guy Rodgers and Jerry Sloan).  During the 1968–1969 season, Boozer averaged a career-high 21.7 points per game, but the Bulls failed to make the playoffs, and Boozer was soon traded to the Seattle SuperSonics.

Milwaukee Bucks 

After a season with the SuperSonics, Boozer was traded to the Bucks with Lucius Allen for Zaid Abdul-Aziz. That season, Boozer played a key role as a reserve as the Bucks won their first NBA championship.

NBA career statistics

Regular season

Playoffs

He ended his career with 12,964 total points and 7,119 total rebounds.

Later years
Boozer returned to Omaha after his career ended, and worked as an executive for the Bell Systems. He was later appointed to the Nebraska Parole Board and volunteered at Boys Town, the home for troubled youth.

Bob Boozer Drive is a street named in his honor in his native Omaha.

Boozer died due to a brain aneurysm in Omaha, Nebraska on May 19, 2012.  He was 75.

References
Sachare, Alex. The Chicago Bulls Encyclopedia. Chicago: Contemporary Books, 1999.

External links

1937 births
2012 deaths
African-American basketball players
All-American college men's basketball players
American men's basketball players
Basketball players at the 1959 Pan American Games
Basketball players at the 1960 Summer Olympics
Basketball players from Nebraska
Chicago Bulls expansion draft picks
Chicago Bulls players
Cincinnati Royals draft picks
Cincinnati Royals players
Deaths from intracranial aneurysm
Kansas State Wildcats men's basketball players
Los Angeles Lakers players
Medalists at the 1959 Pan American Games
Medalists at the 1960 Summer Olympics
Milwaukee Bucks players
National Basketball Association All-Stars
New York Knicks players
Olympic gold medalists for the United States in basketball
Pan American Games gold medalists for the United States
Pan American Games medalists in basketball
Peoria Caterpillars players
Power forwards (basketball)
Seattle SuperSonics players
Sportspeople from Omaha, Nebraska
United States men's national basketball team players
20th-century African-American sportspeople
21st-century African-American people